Conker the Squirrel is a fictional anthropomorphic red squirrel starring in various video games, primarily known for featuring in Conker's Bad Fur Day. He first appeared alongside Diddy Kong in Rareware's Diddy Kong Racing. Other appearances outside of the Conker series include Project Spark. Conker is voiced by Chris Seavor in all of his appearances.

History 

At E3 1997 Rareware announced Conker's Quest, a 3D platformer aimed at a young audience starring Conker the Squirrel. Later the same year, Conker debuted in Rareware's Diddy Kong Racing for the Nintendo 64, as a promotion for his future titles. After Conker's Quest was significantly delayed in the spring of 1998, long after the initial release date, it was renamed Twelve Tales: Conker 64. In 1999, Conker made his first leading debut in Conker's Pocket Tales for Game Boy Color.

Before its release, Conker 64 underwent a complete transformation due to criticism for being "another kids game." Rareware reimagined Conker as a foul-mouthed, fourth-wall breaking alcoholic armed with guns, throwing knives, and a frying pan. The game was retooled to appeal to an older audience. It would feature excessive violence, sexual content, foul language, and drug and alcohol use. The game was retitled Conker's Bad Fur Day and released on March 5, 2001. The game suffered from poor sales due to releasing near the end of the Nintendo 64's lifespan in addition to targeting an older audience on the primarily family-friendly console. However, the game quickly garnered a cult following for its unique brand of humor.

Microsoft acquired Rare in 2002, It was rebranded from Rareware.

In 2005, a remake was released for the Xbox known as Conker: Live & Reloaded. This featured Bad Fur Day with vastly improved graphics and minor alterations to gameplay. Also included was a never-before-seen multiplayer adaptation that was available for use over Xbox Live.

According to an interview with Chris Seavor, there was to be a sequel called Conker's Other Bad Fur Day sometime after Live & Reloaded. The game would had featured Conker being dethroned, imprisoned due to spending the entire royal treasury on beer, parties, and hookers. He would escape with a ball-and-chain restraint locked on him. The plotline was finished, but due to Microsoft's lack of demand for a Conker Sequel, the game production was shelved.

Conker was later brought back in the game Project Spark, once again voiced by Seavor. An episodic campaign for the game called Conker's Big Reunion, set 10 years after Bad Fur Day, was released on April 23, 2015.

Appearance 
When Conker was introduced in Diddy Kong Racing, he had no gloves, a shirt that was blue in the front and yellow on the back, blue and yellow shoes, and a flat tail. This appearance was kept for Pocket Tales. In Bad Fur Day, Conker was given white gloves, a blue zipper hoodie, and the white circle was removed from his shoes to lessen their likeness to Converse shoes. In Live and Reloaded, the gloves were removed, his fur was scruffier, his blue hoodie outfit was now more detailed with yellow patches and more zippers, and most notably, he was now wearing green and yellow shorts. In Project Spark, Conker's appearance is based on that of Conker's Bad Fur Day, albeit much more detailed.

Appearances and Portrayal

Donkey Kong series (Diddy Kong Racing & Conker's Pocket Tales) 
It is stated that he had met and befriended Diddy Kong prior to the races with Diddy and his friends. He portrayed as always kind-hearted and polite. After Diddy Kong Racing, in the story of Conker's Pocket Tales, his goal is to retrieve stolen birthday presents from evil acorns. In the game, he meets and couples up with a chipmunk girl known as Berri. Berri was originally depicted as a little, cute brown anthropomorphic chipmunk.

Bad Fur Day and Live & Reloaded 
In Bad Fur Day, after Conker's personality change, he's much more sarcastic and snide to those around him and speaks in a pitch shifted lisp.

Berri's ditzy traits still remain, but she is now depicted as an adult film star and prostitute. Conker and Berri's relationship developed and they're now living together. Berri becomes frustrated with Conker's habit of constantly staying out late at a bar with his friends. One night, Conker wanders out of the bar after a long night of drinking and turns down the road and heads home. Along the way, he's pulled into an outrageous adventure.

In the course of the game, Berri is killed by an Xenomorph-like enemy. Conker, in a talk with the game developers, is divinely granted a weapon to kill the alien. Realizing the power the developers have, Conker wishes he had asked them to resurrect Berri instead. He tries to break the fourth wall again, but is met with only silence. Conker is named king of all the land for his heroism in the game. Although now rich and powerful, he realizes that he would rather have Berri, his only true reason of living.

Filled with regret, Conker returns to his drunken ways. One rainy night he finds himself stumbling out from the bar, only going the other direction, opposite to the one that began the game. Implying Conker wanders to another destructive adventure or, perhaps, back home.

Conker has ten prominent weapons: a pair of machine guns, a shotgun, throwing knives, a bazooka, a frying pan, a slingshot, a baseball bat with nails in it, a flamethrower and urine. In the opening of Bad Fur Day, he cut up the Nintendo 64 emblem with a chainsaw in half and replaced it with the Rare logo.

Other appearances 
In an Xbox commercial, he was shown with Banjo (Banjo-Kazooie), Joanna Dark and Kameo in which he uses a chainsaw to change the word "Xbox" into Rare.

The future of his franchise uncertain, Conker remained a much talked about character. In June 2014, he was announced to appear in the game Project Spark. In Project Spark, the player could buy Conker's Big Reunion, and the Conker Character Creator pack. However, Conker's Big Reunion was cancelled due to Microsoft announcing that the game would transition to a new "free and open creation" model, thus ceasing the production of all the downloadable content, including future Conker episodes. In 2016 a game called Young Conker was released for the Microsoft HoloLens. It a features a "younger" version of Conker with a redesign.

Reception
The contrast between Conker's innocent appearance and his coarse behavior has been well-received by the public. Rare listed Conker as the fifth Rare's video game character who most improved with age. In 2009, Conker was ranked at the fourth place on GameDailys "Top 25 Anti-Heroes" list, with they stating that "he may not look like an anti-hero, but that's what makes Conker stand out from the rest." IGN listed the "Ten Best Things About Conker: Live and Reloaded," saying, "in the end, the reason we love Conker: Live and Reloaded so much is because of the big man himself," and also cited the "everyone's favorite boozy squirrel" among the "Gaming's Most Notorious Anti-Heroes," adding he is "cool." In his appearance in Conker: Live and Reloaded, he was called by GameSpy as "cuter than ever," and Dave Kosak said it "makes it all the funnier when he pukes or looks over his shoulder and blurts out a stream of beeped-out expletives." Jordan Devore of Destructoid praised Conker's appearance in Project Spark and stated that "There was no getting around the disappointment of seeing a long abandoned (but never forgotten!) character return not in his own adventure, but in a DLC pack for a videogame about making games."

When a Young Conker was showed on Microsoft HoloLens's trailer, it received mostly negative reviews. Chris Plante of The Verge criticized it and said that "Young Conker doesn't feature the original Conker." Sam Loveridge of GameSpy claimed that the scene of Squirrel and the bees is "weird."

GamesRadar stated that Conker was one of their most wanted characters for the crossover fighting video game series Super Smash Bros.

Merchandise
In 2018, a Conker based figurine and statue was made. In 2022, Rare announced the release of "The Great Mighty Poo Singing Plush," a "Bad Fur Brew" hoodie, a "Cheers, Jeers, and Beers" t-shirt, and a "Drunk Tank" 18" x 24" poster.

Further reading

References 

Animal characters in video games
Anthropomorphic squirrels
Anthropomorphic video game characters
Fictional criminals in video games
Fictional mercenaries in video games
Conker (series)
Fictional alcohol abusers
Fictional characters who break the fourth wall
Fictional gamblers
Fictional squirrels
Fictional World War II veterans
King characters in video games
Male characters in video games
Child characters in video games
Microsoft protagonists
Rare (company) characters
Video game characters introduced in 1997